Masovian Railways, in Polish Koleje Mazowieckie, is a regional rail operator in the Masovian Voivodeship of Poland.

History 
The company was founded in 2004 as a joint venture of the Masovian Voivodeship, with 51% shares, and the, then government-owned, PKP Przewozy Regionalne, with 49% shares, to handle local passenger traffic in the Voivodeship. It started operating on 1 January 2005. Since the end of 2007 Masovian Railways has been fully owned by the Masovian Voivodeship.

Rolling stock 
At the beginning the rolling stock consisted of old electric multiple units taken over from PKP. These were gradually modernised, and further units purchased second-hand from other operators. Later on, the company purchased or leased new rolling stock. As of 2010 the Masovian Railways had just under 200 PKP class EN57, five EN71 and two EW60. Additionally the company purchased seven DB Class 627 railcars and four 628 diesel multiple units to serve on non-electrified routes.

In 2008 the company bought 10 modern Stadler FLIRT EMUs and 26 Bombardier Double-deck Coaches along with 11 cab cars. At the beginning, Masovian Railways leased 11 EU07 electric locomotives from PKP Cargo to work these trains, since 2011 they are pulled by TRAXX P160 DC purchased from Bombardier.

In 2011 the company bought 16 PESA ELF EMUs designated class EN76 and 4 SA135 DMUs also from PESA.

In January 2018 the company ordered 71 Stadler Flirt EMUs. 

As of May 2021, the company owns, leases, or hires the following rolling stock:

Railway lines

Main lines 

Across the Warsaw Cross-City Line
KM1 line to Skierniewice, through Pruszków, Grodzisk Mazowiecki, Żyrardów (hourly to Skierniewice, more frequently to Żyrardów and more to Grodzisk)
KM2 line to Łuków, through Sulejówek, Mińsk Mazowiecki, Siedlce (hourly to Siedlce, more frequently to Mińsk, with additional trains between Siedlce and Łuków)
KM3 line to Kutno, through Sochaczew, Łowicz (almost hourly to Łowicz, more frequently to Sochaczew)
KM7 line to Dęblin, through Otwock, Pilawa (hourly to Dęblin, much more frequently to Otwock)
variant of KM8 line to Skarżysko-Kamienna, through Piaseczno, Radom (infrequent)
variant of KM8 line to Góra Kalwaria, through Piaseczno (infrequent)
minor variant of KM9 line to Działdowo, Mława through Legionowo, Nasielsk (once a day)
minor variant of KM6 line to Tłuszcz, through Wołomin (infrequent)
On the Warsaw Circumferential Line: major variant of KM9 line from Warszawa Wola and Warszawa Gdańska station to Mława, Działdowo, through Legionowo, Nasielsk (infrequent)
Until late 2011 Masovian Railways also used to operate a S9 line between Warszawa Gdańska and Legionowo for Warsaw Transport Authority, operating outside the company's fare system and branding
major variant of KM6 line from Warszawa Wileńska station to Małkinia, through Wołomin, Tłuszcz (Warszawa – Tłuszcz is the most frequent service)

Minor lines 
From Legionowo to Tłuszcz
From Radom to Drzewica
From Radom to Dęblin
From Nasielsk to Sierpc
From Tłuszcz to Ostrołęka
From Siedlce to Czeremcha
From Sierpc, through Płock, to Kutno

Regional Express 
Trains which compete with InterRegio and PKP Intercity. Most of them have air conditioning and are accessible to disabled passengers.
Locomotive-hauled:
Łukowianka on KM2 line from Łuków to Warsaw, through Siedlce, Mińsk Mazowiecki (the name means a female inhabitant of Łuków)
Mazovia on KM3 line from Płock to Warsaw, through Kutno, Łowicz, Sochaczew
Radomiak on KM8 line from Skarżysko-Kamienna to Warsaw, through Radom, Piaseczno (the name means a male inhabitant of Radom)
Słoneczny from Warsaw to Gdynia or Ustka, through Legionowo, Nasielsk, Działdowo, Gdańsk (only in summer, KM9 line, the name means Sunny)
Wiedenka on KM1 line from Skierniewice to Warsaw, through Żyrardów (the name means a female inhabitant of Vienna (Wiedeń in Polish) but refers to common name of the Warsaw–Vienna railway line through Skierniewice)
EMUs:
Bolimek on KM1 line from Żyrardów to Warsaw (the name refers to Bolimów Landscape Park)
Rudka on KM2 line from Siedlce to Warsaw, through Mińsk Mazowiecki (one of the fastest trains in Poland; the name refers to the spa near the Mrozy station).

Some trains on KM2 Warsaw – Mińsk Mazowiecki – Siedlce line do not stop at certain stops.

Cooperation with Warsaw public transport system 
Within the Warsaw metropolitan area, long- and medium-term tickets issued by the Public Transport Authority (those valid for 24 hours or longer), previously validated in city buses, trams, metro or Fast Urban Rail are honoured in all regular trains of Masovian Railways.

See also 
Szybka Kolej Miejska (SKM) - Rapid transit and commuter rail system in the Warsaw metropolitan area.
Warszawska Kolej Dojazdowa (WKD) - Light rail commuter line in Poland's capital city of Warsaw.
Polskie Koleje Państwowe S.A. - Dominant railway operator in Poland.
Polregio - Polish railway operator; formerly Przewozy Regionalne.

References

External links 

Masovian Railways

Masovian Voivodeship
Railway companies of Poland
Transport in Warsaw
Railway companies established in 2004
Polish companies established in 2004